Calis may refer to:
 Calis, West Virginia
 Natasha Calis, Canadian actress
 Center for Active Learning in International Studies (CALIS), a K-12 outreach program sponsored by the University of Southern California
 Calis, also known as Arnis, is the national sport and martial art of the Philippines

See also 
 Çalış (disambiguation)